The Human Sexipede (full title: The Human Sexipede (First Sequence: A porn parody)) is a 2010 American pornographic horror film written and directed by Lee Roy Myers. The film is a parody of the 2009 film The Human Centipede (First Sequence).

Cast

Reception
The Human Sexipede has received attention from not only the adult film industry, but from more mainstream media. Best Week Ever described the trailer as "legitimately pretty funny and well-written".

References

External links
 

2010 horror films
2010 films
2010s parody films
2010s pornographic films
American parody films
American pornographic films
Films shot in Los Angeles
Pornographic parody films of horror films
2010 comedy films
Films directed by Lee Roy Myers
2010s American films